San Fedele Intelvi was a comune (municipality) in the Province of Como in the Italian region Lombardy, located about  north of Milan and about  north of Como, on the border with Switzerland.  On 1 January 2018 it was merged with Casasco d'Intelvi and Castiglione d'Intelvi to form the new comune of Centro Valle Intelvi.

Cities and towns in Lombardy